3-Fluorophenmetrazine  (also known as 3-FPM, 3-FPH and PAL-593) is a phenylmorpholine-based stimulant and fluorinated analogue of phenmetrazine that has been sold online as a designer drug.

Chemistry
3-Fluorophenmetrazine is a fluorinated analogue of phenmetrazine, a stimulant of the morpholine class.

3-Fluorophenmetrazine is a regioisomer of both 2-fluorophenmetrazine and 4-fluorophenmetrazine.

Pharmacology
3-FPM acts as a norepinephrine–dopamine releasing agent with EC50 values of 30 nM and 43 nM, respectively. It shows only negligible efficacy as a releaser of serotonin, with an EC50 value of 2558 nM.

3-FPM also inhibits uptake mediated by dopamine transporters and norepinephrine transporters in HEK293 cells with potencies comparable to cocaine (IC50 values < 2.5 μM), but with less potent effects at serotonin transporters (IC50 values >80 μM).

At sufficient doses, 3-FPM is capable of  reversing monoamine transporters, particularly transporters of the catecholamines dopamine and norepinephrine, and, to a much lesser degree, serotonin transporters, thereby releasing these neurotransmitters from the cytosol into the extracellular space, where they are active.

Evaluation of its metabolic pathway revealed N‐oxidation, aryl hydroxylation and subsequent O‐methylation, alkyl hydroxylation, oxidation, and degradation of the ethyl‐bridge yielding the O/N‐bis‐dealkylated metabolite, combinations thereof and further glucuronidation or sulfations.

Legality
In the United States, 3-fluorophenmetrazine is not explicitly illegal at the federal level. However, on November 16, 2016, it became an illegal substance in the state of Virginia. Pursuant to subsection D of § 54.1-3443 of the Code of Virginia, the state Board of Pharmacy designated it as a Schedule I controlled substance, effective through May 10, 2018. Although the initial regulatory period has lapsed, during their 2019 legislative session, the Virginia state legislature is set to vote on a bill that would permanently schedule 3-fluorophenmetrazine as an illegal, Schedule I substance, and it is likely that the bill will succeed. 

Sweden's public health agency suggested to classify 3-Fluorophenmetrazine as illegal narcotic on June 1, 2015. It was finally classified on October 15, 2015.

3-Fluorophenmetrazine is illegal in Switzerland as of December 2015.

See also
 3F-NEH
 3F-PiHP
 3F-PVP
 3-Fluoromethamphetamine
 3-Fluoromethcathinone
 3-Chlorophenmetrazine
 4-Methylphenmetrazine
 6'-Methylphenmetrazine
 G-130
 Manifaxine
 Methylenedioxyphenmetrazine
 Phenmetrazine
 Phendimetrazine
 List of substituted phenylmorpholines

References

Substituted amphetamines
Phenylmorpholines
Norepinephrine-dopamine releasing agents
Stimulants
Designer drugs
Fluoroarenes